Per Gustafsson i Benestad  (16 October 1880 - 14 April 1942) was a Swedish politician. He was a member of the Centre Party.

References
This article was initially translated from the Swedish Wikipedia article.

Centre Party (Sweden) politicians
1880 births
1942 deaths